The Kanaka Durga Varadhi is a beam bridge Spanning Across Krishna River in between Mangalagiri Tadepalle Municipal Corporation and Vijayawada, Andhra Pradesh, India. It is the Third Longest Road Bridge in Andhra Pradesh, After Bridges on Godavari river, Whereas the Longest  of all bridges is in Andhra Pradesh Capital Region. Its construction was followed by old barrage named Prakasam Barrage, which serves the transportation needs of Vijayawada.

Previously, the Bridge was 2,200 metres long, Consisting of 47 Spans of 34 M in a straight Line without any Curves. It was later Extended under the Project of expanding NH16 from Vijayawada to Chennai. Now the bridge is 2.6 Kilometers Long with a Curve Consisting of a Flyover that intersects NH65, which connects Machilipatnam with Hyderabad. It was 27th largest bridge in India.

Geography 
The maximum discharge observed in the river is reported to be around 1,110,000 cu ft/s (31,000 m3/s).

Construction 
In 2012 NHAI constructed a bridge by extending Kanaka Durga Varadhi towards Vijayawada to ease flow of traffic towards Hyderabad. This was part of widening National Highway 16 from Eluru to Chilakaluripet. A park is being constructed below this flyover with Dharmachakras that resembles chakras which surround Amaravathi Mahachaitya by Amaravathi Development corporation with a radius of 40 feet. This project will ease the transportation between Kolkata and Chennai.

See also 
 List of road bridges
 List of longest bridges in the world
 List of longest bridges above water in India

References

Bridges completed in 1995
1995 establishments in Andhra Pradesh
Beam bridges
Bridges over the Krishna river
Buildings and structures in Vijayawada
Buildings and structures in Krishna district
Transport in Krishna district
Road bridges in India
Bridges and flyovers in Vijayawada
20th-century architecture in India